Bumpkin may refer to:
Country bumpkin, a synonym for the term yokel; a foolish, poorly educated person from a rural region
Boomkin, also known as a bumpkin, part of a sailboat

See also
 Bumpkin Island, Boston Harbor, Massachusetts
 "Country Bumpkin", 1974 song by Cal Smith